Agniohammus brunneus is a species of beetle in the family Cerambycidae. It was described by Stephan von Breuning in 1967, originally under the genus Elongatorsidis. It is known from Borneo.

References

Lamiini
Beetles described in 1967